Castra (Latin, singular castrum) were military forts of various sizes used by the Roman army throughout the Empire in various places of Europe, Asia and Africa.
The largest castra were permanent legionary fortresses.

Locations
The disposition of the castra reflects the most important zones of the empire from a military point of view. Many castra were disposed along frontiers particularly in Northern and Central Europe. Another focal point was the Eastern border, where the Roman Empire confronted one of its long-term enemies, the Persian Empire. Other castra were located in strategically important zones, as in Egypt, from which most of the wealth of the empire came. Finally, other castra were located in zones in which the Romans experienced local unrest, such as Northern Spain and Judea. Provinces where the Roman power was unchallenged, such as Italy, Gaul, Africa and Greece, were provided with few or no castra.

In the long history of the Roman Empire, the character of the military policy of the Roman Empire changed, and consequently the location and dimension of the castra changed. Under Emperors Gallienus and Aurelian (and later Diocletian), the Roman army was organized into a high-mobility central army (the comitatus) and in local troops (the limitanei). Some castra lost importance, others were built in new zones, and in general they lost the role of permanent quarter for huge corps of troops.

Castra by Roman province

Aegyptus
Alexandria, Babylon, Coptos, Nicopolis (Egypt)

Africa
Ammaedara, Lambaesis, Thamugas, Theveste

Arabia Petraea and its limes
Betthorus (modern el-Lejjun in Jordan), legionary fortress on the Limes Arabicus where the Legio IV Martia was stationed in the 4th century.

Armenia
Satala

Britannia

Alauna, Arbeia, Banna, Branodunum, Bremenium, Burrium, Camulodunum, Derventio Coritanorum, Derventio (Malton), Deva Victrix, Eboracum, Epiacum, Glevum, Isca Dumnoniorum, Isca Augusta, Condercum, Concangis, Corinium, Galava, Glannoventa, Leucarum, Lindum, Mamucium, Manduessedum, Mediobogdum, Navio, Morbium, Olicana, Pinnata Castra, Portus Adurni, Regulbium, Segedunum, Trimontium, Vindolanda, Vinovia, Viroconium, Voreda

Also castra of unknown name:
Bar Hill, Bearsden, Lunt Fort, Normandykes, Raedykes, Templeborough

Cappadocia
Melitene

Commagene
Samosata, Zeugma

Corsica
Aleria, Aurelianus

Dacia

Acidava, Ad Mutrium, Ad Pannonios, Agnaviae, Aizis, Altenum, Angustia, Apulum, Arcidava, Arcobara, Arutela, Auraria Daciae, Bacaucis, Berzovia, Buridava, Caput Bubali, Caput Stenarum, Castra Traiana, Castra Nova, Certinae, Cumidava, Dierna, Drobeta, Jidava, Largiana, Micia, Naissus, Napoca, Optatiana, Partiscum, Pelendava, Pons Aluti, Pons Vetus, Porolissum, Potaissa, Praetoria Augusta, Praetorium (Copăceni), Praetorium (Mehadia), Resculum, Romula, Rupes, Rusidava, Samum, Sucidava, Tibiscum, Ulpia Traiana Sarmizegetusa

Also castra of unknown name:
Albești, Bădeni, Băile Homorod, Boroșneu Mare, Brusturi, Brâncovenești, Bucium, Buciumi, Bulci, Bumbești-Jiu - Gară, Bumbești-Jiu - Vârtop, Băneasa, Bănița, Chitid, Cigmău, Cincșor, Cioroiu Nou, Colțești, Constantin Daicoviciu, Cornuțel, Cristești, Crâmpoia, Călugăreni, Desa, Duleu - Cornet cetate, Duleu - Odăi, Federi, Feldioara, Fizești, Fâlfani, Gherla, Gilău, Gresia, Hinova, Hoghiz, Hunedoara, Ighiu, Islaz, Izbășești, Izvoarele, Jac, Livezile, Luncani / Târsa, Moldova Nouă, Negreni, Ocna Sibiului, Olteni, Odorheiu Secuiesc, Orheiu Bistriței, Pietroasele, Pietroșani, Ploiești, Plosca, Poiana, Pojejena, Porceni, Purcăreni, Putineiu, Puținei, Roșiorii de Vede, Râu Bărbat, Răcarii de Jos, Războieni-Cetate, Reci, Salcia, Sfârleanca, Sighișoara, Slăveni, Stremț, Surducu Mare, Sânpaul (Harghita), Sânpaul (Mureș), Săpata de Jos, Sărățeni, Sfârleanca, Tihău, Titești, Târnăveni, Urlueni, Voinești, Voislova, Șinca Veche, Zăvoi

Possible castra mentioned on Tabula Peutingeriana but not investigated:
Ad Aquas/Aquae, Brucla, Gaganis, Masclianis, Petris, Salinae/Salinis

Dalmatia
Delminium, Burnum, Ragusia or Laus, Tilurium, Split

Gallia
Argentoratum, Castra Constantia, Lugdunum

Also castra of unknown name:
Oudenburg

Germania
Abusina, Augusta Vindelicorum, Bonna, Colonia Agrippinae, Flevum, Moguntiacum, Novaesium, Noviomagus, Traiectum, Vetera

Also castra of unknown name:
Saalburg

Hispania
Asturica Augusta, Castra Servilia, Legio, Lucus Augusti, Tarraco

Italia
Castra ad Fluvium Frigidum, Castra Albana, Castra Nova equitum singularium, Castra of ancient Rome, Castra Peregrina, Castra Praetoria, Cremona, Emona, Castra Taurinorum, Placentia

Judaea
See also Syria Palaestina. Included here are the Galilee and Perea.
Legio, Aelia Capitolina , Raphana

Mesopotamia
Nisibis, Singara, Ziata

Moesia

Ad Stoma, Arrubium, Altinum, Argamum, Axiopolis, Beroe, Callatis, Capidava, Carsium, Cius, Dinogetia, Drajna de Sus, Histriopolis, Halmyris, Libida, Novae, Noviodunum, Oescus, Ratiaria, Sacidava, Salsovia, Scupi, Singidunum, Stratonis, Tomis, Troesmis, Ulmetum, Viminacium

Also castra of unknown name:
Basarabi-Murfatlar, Tirighina-Bărboși, Cernavodă

Noricum
Asturis (Zwentendorf), Cannabiaca (Zeiselmauer-Wolfpassing), Comagena, Lauriacum, Lentia

Osrhoene
Circesium

Pannonia
Aquincum, Brigetio, Carnuntum, Mursa, Poetovio, Sirmium, Taurunum, Vindobona

Raetia
Brigantium, Castra Regina, Batavis, Castra Maiense

Maxima Sequanorum
Augusta Raurica, Vindonissa

Syria
Androna, Apamea, Bostra, Dura, Emesa

See also 
 List of ancient cities in Thrace and Dacia

References

External links 

 

de:Legionslager
la:Castra
ro:Castra